Macroglossum haxairei is a moth of the  family Sphingidae. It is known from Sulawesi.

References

Macroglossum
Moths described in 2003